Otaq Sara (also Romanized as Oţāq Sarā; also known as Ojāq Sarā and Oţāq Sar) is a village in Gatab-e Jonubi Rural District, Gatab District, Babol County, Mazandaran Province, Iran. At the 2006 census, its population was 1,468, in 349 families.

References 

Populated places in Babol County